The Greek Basket League Most Popular Player, or Greek Basket League MPP, is an annual award for the "most popular player" of each season of Greece's top-tier level professional basketball club league, the Greek Basket League.

Most Popular Players

References

External links
 Official Greek Basket League Site 
 Official Greek Basket League YouTube Channel 
 Official Hellenic Basketball Federation Site 
 Basketblog.gr 
 GreekBasketball.gr 

Greek Basket League
Most Popular Player
European basketball awards